12 O'Clock High is an American military drama television series set in World War II. It was originally broadcast on ABC-TV for two-and-one-half TV seasons from September 1964 through January 1967 and was based on the 1949 film of the same name. The series was a co-production of 20th Century Fox Television (Fox had also produced the movie) and QM Productions (one of their few non-law enforcement series). This show is one of the two QM shows not to display a copyright notice at the beginning, but rather at the end (the other was A Man Called Sloane) and the only one not to display the standard "A QM Production" closing card on the closing credits.

Overview 
The series follows the missions of the fictitious 918th Bombardment Group (Heavy) of the U.S. Army Air Forces (USAAF), equipped with B-17 Flying Fortress heavy bombers, stationed at Archbury Field, England (a fictitious air base). For the first season, many of the characters from the book and 1949 movie were retained, including Brigadier General Frank Savage, Major Harvey Stovall, Major Cobb, Doc Kaiser, and General Pritchard, albeit played by different actors from in the motion picture. In addition to these characters, several other infrequently reappearing characters were introduced, including Captain (later Colonel) Joseph "Joe" Gallagher, who appeared in two episodes (episodes 1 and 24) as well as being the central character for seasons 2 and 3.

At the end of the first season, the studio executives decided a younger-looking lead actor was needed. In the first episode of the second season, General Savage, played by Robert Lansing, was killed in action and replaced by Colonel Joe Gallagher, played by Paul Burke. (Burke, though considered more youthful-looking than Lansing, was actually two years older, a fact that TV critics were quick to point out.) The decision to replace Lansing with Burke proved unpopular and the ratings began to drop quickly.

The character Joe Gallagher's father was Lt. General Maxwell Gallagher, played by Barry Sullivan. Burke and Sullivan had previously worked together in the TV series Harbormaster. In an interview given by Lansing on The Mike Douglas Show in 1965, Lansing mentioned that had he known what a boost to his career 12 O'Clock High was, he never would have fired himself. Savage was killed off in a way so as not to require Lansing's participation. According to TV Guide, ABC moved the show from a 10:00 pm Friday time slot to a 7:30 pm Monday time slot for the second season to capture a younger audience. It was hoped that TV viewers would identify more with a colonel rather than an Army Air Corps general. Lansing, had he remained, would have received limited air time with Burke's addition.

For the second season, most of the supporting cast from the first season was replaced, with the exception of Major Stovall, Doc Kaiser, and an occasional appearance by General Pritchard. Other actors who did reappear after the first season played other characters. Edward Mulhare appeared twice – as different Luftwaffe officers. Bruce Dern appeared four times as three different characters. Tom Skerritt appeared five times, each time in a different role.

The first two seasons were filmed in black-and-white, as ABC did not mandate prime time shows to be in color until the 1966-1967 season, but it also allowed the inclusion of actual World War II combat footage supplied by the U.S. Air Force and the library of 20th Century Fox movies. The inclusion of combat footage was often obvious, as it was often quite degraded. Limited usable combat footage often resulted in the same shot being reused in multiple episodes. For the third season, the TV series was filmed in color, but this season only ran for 17 episodes, with the series being canceled in midseason. Some of the combat footage used for the third season seemed to be in black-and-white footage tinted blue. Film footage from the 1940s was also used for take-offs and landings since the one B-17 to which the show had access could only taxi. To simulate different aircraft, it was frequently repainted.

In later episodes, Gallagher flew as "mission control" in a North American P-51 Mustang. This plot scheme was added to cut production costs. The single-engine Mustang costs less to fly than the four-engined B-17, and requires only a single pilot rather than two pilots and several crewmen. A wartime precedent for this existed, however: Maj.-Gen. Earle E. Partridge, the G-3 (operations) commander of the 8th Air Force, used a P-51 modified for photo-reconnaissance work to take photographs of his bomber group formations for training and critiquing purposes.

12 O'Clock High was created in an episodic format, with no particular order for the episodes. A trio of episodes produced about a shuttle air raid to North Africa was in fact never aired in story order (episode 44 "We're Not Coming Back", episode 37 "Big Brother", and episode 38 "The Hotshot"). The stories were often based more on character drama than action, usually involving individuals who felt the need to redeem themselves in the eyes of others. Other story lines focused on actual war events, such as the development of bombing through cloud cover using radar, and the complexities of operating a large fleet of (often malfunctioning) B-17s.

Much of the filming was carried out on the Chino Airport, just east of Los Angeles County, California, in San Bernardino County. Chino had been a USAAF training field for World War II, and its combination of long, heavy-duty runways and (at the time) wide-open farmland for miles in all directions was rapidly turning the field into a haven for World War II aviation enthusiasts and their restored aircraft. Former Army Air Forces P-51 Mustangs, Republic P-47 Thunderbolts, Lockheed P-38 Lightnings, B-26 Invaders, and former U.S. Navy and U.S. Marine Corps F4U Corsairs and F6F Hellcats could be found, along with a vintage B-17 and the P-51 Mustang used in 12 O'Clock High.

The B-17 belonged to Ed Maloney's Air Museum, B-17E, F, and G models of the Flying Fortress (the latter with the chin turret) were used interchangeably. The inclusion of actual combat and crash footage often resulted in the tail designations of the bombers changing between film shots.

The segments in 1966 had the former Royal Canadian Air Force pilot Lynn Garrison coordinating the aerial footage. Garrison had been drawn to the project by his friend Robert Lansing. Garrison owned the P-51 used in the series.

As of February 2020, the Heroes & Icons channel broadcasts the series as part of its Saturday-night lineup.

Cast 

 Robert Lansing as Brigadier General Frank Savage (season 1)
 Frank Overton as Major Harvey Stovall
 Paul Burke as Colonel Joe Gallagher (seasons 2 and 3, two appearances in season 1)
 Chris Robinson as T/Sgt. Alexander "Sandy" Komansky (seasons 2 and 3)
 John Larkin as Major General Wiley Crowe (season 1)
 Barney Phillips as Major "Doc" Kaiser
 Andrew Duggan as Brigadier/Major General Ed Britt (seasons 2 and 3)
 Paul Newlan as Lieutenant General Bill Pritchard
 Lew Gallo as Major Joe Cobb (season 1)
 Robert Dornan as Lieutenant/Captain Fowler (seasons 2 and 3)

Episodes

Season 1 (1964–65)

Season 2 (1965–66)

Season 3 (1966–67)

Awards and honors

Comic books 
Dell Comics produced a comic book based on the series that ran two issues in 1965. Both had photocovers and artwork by Joe Sinnott.

References

External links 

 
 

1964 American television series debuts
1967 American television series endings
1960s American drama television series
American Broadcasting Company original programming
American military television series
Aviation television series
Black-and-white American television shows
Dell Comics titles
English-language television shows
Television shows adapted into comics
Live action television shows based on films
Television series based on actual events
Television series by 20th Century Fox Television
Television shows set in California
World War II television drama series